Leesville Lake is a reservoir located near Ohio State Route 212 and Leesville, Ohio. The lake is named for the village of Leesville.

The McGuire Creek forms the south branch of the C shaped lake, while the north branch is formed by the North Fork McGuire Creek and Bear Hole Run.  The Dam was completed in October, 1936 at a cost of $941,000 by the Muskingum Watershed Conservancy District. The operation of the lake and dam, along with the property immediately surrounding the dam site, was transferred to the U.S. Army Corps of Engineers, Huntington District, after the approval of the Flood Control Act of 1939 by Congress.  The MWCD continues to be responsible for the management of much of the reservoir areas behind the dam, serving as a partner to the U.S. Army Corps of Engineers for flood reduction. In addition to operating a number of recreation facilities, the MWCD cooperates with the Ohio Division of Wildlife for fishing and hunting management.

Leesville Dam
The Leesville Dam is a rolled earth fill with impervious core, maximum height 74 ft, top length 1695 ft, top width 25 ft, base width about 450 ft. With a 4.1 ft parapet wall on top of the dam with a top elevation of 995.1.Spillway: Uncontrolled concrete lined saddle spillway near left (south) abutment, crest elevation 977.5, length of crest 150 ft, design discharge  with surcharge of 12.6 ft and freeboard of 5 ft.Outlet Works: Intake structure with three sluices controlled by 3.5 ft x 7 ft gates and discharges through a 7 ft diameter horseshoe tunnel through the right abutment into a stilling basin. Two 1.5 ft diameter siphons, located in front of the gates of the two outer sluices and discharging into the center sluice, are provided for maintaining the minimum pool.Other Structures: noneMaximum flow of record at the dam site:  (04-20-1940)Reservoir design flood peak flow: .

Levels above normal can cause road closures near the lake. Levels are returned to summer pool in the spring.

Recreation

Camping

Leesville North Fork Marina & Campground (formerly known as Petersburg Marina & Campground) is located on the north fork or Leesville Lake, a few miles off of Ohio State Route 332.  The facility features boat rentals, dock rental, RV and primitive site rentals and cottage rentals.  More information available at www.LeesvilleLake.com

Summer camps

The Salvation Army runs Camp Neosa at the lake.

The United Methodist Church runs Camp Aldersgate on the north side of the lake.

Camp Wakonda is run by the Christ Presbyterian Church on the north side of the lake between NEOSA & Firebird Roosevelt.

The Ohio FFA runs Camp Muskingum on the south side of the north fork of the lake.

Camp Firebird and Roosevelt is located on the north side of the lake.

Falcon Camp is across from Firebird & Roosevelt between the two forks.

Community

The Leesville Lake POA is becoming active for the first time in many years. Its meeting place is on Autumn Rd just off of the lake.

Fishing and boating

Leesville Lake continues to be the top muskellunge lake in the state of Ohio, with several record muskies caught over the years. Both Leesville North Fork Marina & Campground, and Leesville South Fork Marina offer boat rental, cabin rental, dock rental and bait & tackle.  More information is available at www.LeesvilleLake.com

References

External links
Ohio DNR fishing map of Leesville Lake
Carroll County Visitor's Bureau

Reservoirs in Ohio
Bodies of water of Carroll County, Ohio
Tourist attractions in Carroll County, Ohio
Dams in Ohio
Muskingum Watershed Conservancy District
United States Army Corps of Engineers, Huntington District